"Don't Break My Heart Again" is a song by the English hard rock band Whitesnake from their 1981 studio album Come an' Get It. Written by vocalist David Coverdale, the song was inspired by the breakdown of his first marriage. The guitar solo performed by Bernie Marsden was recorded on the first take. Despite numerous attempts to top it, Marsden eventually conceded and agreed to use the first take. Guitarist Doug Aldrich (who played with the band from 2003 to 2014) later named "Don't Break My Heart Again" one of his favorite Whitesnake songs.

Release
The song was released as the lead single from Come an' Get It in March 1981. The B-side features the track "Child of Babylon", which is also on the album. "Don't Break My Heart Again" reached number 17 on UK Singles Chart. A music video was also produced and the band performed the song on the German television show Rockpop.

Track listing
7" single (UK)
"Don't Break My Heart Again" - 4:04 (David Coverdale)
"Child of Babylon" - 4:50 (Coverdale/Bernie Marsden)

Personnel
David Coverdale – vocals
Micky Moody – guitar, backing vocals
Bernie Marsden – guitar, backing vocals
Neil Murray – bass guitar
Ian Paice – drums
Jon Lord – keyboards
Martin Birch - production, engineering, mixing

Charts

References

External links 

Whitesnake songs
1981 songs
Songs written by David Coverdale
Liberty Records singles
British hard rock songs
British blues rock songs